Helmut Ormestad (12 May 1913 – 10 August 1993) was a Norwegian physicist and researcher at the University of Oslo, specializing in acoustics. In 1983 he was awarded the Cappelen Prize, for co-writing the physics textbook series Rom Stoff Tid with Otto Øgrim and Kåre Lunde.

References

1913 births
1993 deaths
Norwegian physicists
University of Oslo alumni
Academic staff of the University of Oslo